The following table is an overview of all national records in the high jump.

Outdoor

Men

Women

Indoor

Men

Women

References

 High jump
High jump